Pic Saint-Loup (Languedocien: Puòg de Sant Lop) is a mountain in Languedoc-Roussillon, southern France, located near the communes of Cazevieille and Saint-Mathieu-de-Tréviers in the Hérault department.

Landforms of Hérault
Mountains of Occitania (administrative region)